Oecetis is a genus of long-horned caddisflies in the family Leptoceridae. There are at least 410 described species in Oecetis.

See also
 List of Oecetis species

References

Further reading

External links

 

Trichoptera genera
Articles created by Qbugbot
Integripalpia